The Freudian, a World Tour was the debut headlining concert tour by Canadian recording artist Daniel Caesar. The tour was in support of his debut album, Freudian (2017). The tour played over 50 dates in North America, Europe, Asia and Australasia.

Background
On August 25, 2017, Caesar released his debut album titled Freudian. At the same date, Caesar announced the North American tour dates, dubbed as "Freudian, A North American Tour". On September 13, 2017, Caesar announced the European tour dates that will take place in January and February 2018. On January 9, 2018, Caesar announced Asian and Australasia dates.

Opening acts
Snoh Aalegra 
DO NOT PUSH!

Setlist
The following setlist was obtained from the concert held on February 6, 2018, at KOKO in London, England. It does not represent all concerts for the duration of the tour.
"Freudian"
"Japanese Denim"
"Best Part"
"Violet"
"Death & Taxes"
"Hold Me Down"
"Take Me Away"
"West"
"Neu Roses (Transgressor's Song)"
"Transform"
"We Find Love"
"Blessed"
"Get You"

Tour dates

Festivals and other miscellaneous performances
This concert was a part of the "Jakarta International Java Jazz Festival"
This concert was a part of the "Wanderland Music and Arts Festival"
This concert was a part of the "Auckland Arts Festival"

Cancellations and rescheduled shows

Box office score data

References

2017 concert tours
2018 concert tours